Fabbrini is an Italian surname. Notable people with the surname include:

Andrea Fabbrini (born 1974), Italian footballer
Diego Fabbrini (born 1990), Italian footballer
Sergio Fabbrini (born 1949), Italian political scientist

Italian-language surnames